Christopher K. Urry (born 29 August 1952) is a former New Zealand male sailor. He represented New Zealand at the 1976 Summer Olympics and competed in the Soling event (mixed three person keelboat event) along with compatriot, Gavin Bornholdt.

References 

1952 births
Living people
New Zealand male sailors (sport)
Olympic sailors of New Zealand
Sailors at the 1976 Summer Olympics – Soling
Sportspeople from Wellington City